Do You Believe? or Do You Believe may refer to:
"Do You Believe?" (The Beatnuts song)
"Do You Believe" (Julie-Anne Dineen song)
"Do You Believe" (Maurice Williams song)
Do You Believe? (film)
Do You Believe? (Cher tour)
"Believe" (Cher song)

See also
 Do You Believe in Magic (disambiguation)